Abraliopsis pacificus is a species of enoploteuthid cephalopod from the northwestern Pacific Ocean, from Japan to Hawaii. This species undergoes vertical migration from 900–500 m depth during the day, rising to 263–102 m depth at night. Male spermatophores are 6.5–7 mm in length.

References

Abraliopsis
Molluscs described in 1990